Erin Way (born September 13, 1987) is an American actress. She is known for her role as Kat in the Syfy drama series Alphas. She joined the show in the third episode of the second season.

A former ballet dancer, Erin Way started acting while in high school.

Filmography

References

External links
 

Living people
1987 births
Actresses from Portland, Oregon
American film actresses
American television actresses
21st-century American actresses
Portland State University alumni